Daniel Florin Ghiță (born 22 April 1981) is a Romanian politician and former kickboxer, who serves as a member of the Chamber of Deputies of Romania since December 2020.

Ghiță is the former It's Showtime heavyweight champion. He formerly competed in Glory, and was the runner up of the Glory Heavyweight Grand Slam tournament. He also competed for the Japanese K-1 promotion, where he made his name in their 2009 and 2010 World Grand Prix seasons.

Ghiță is one of the biggest stars in kickboxing history known for throwing powerful low kicks. He was also known for his enormous left hook. Daniel Ghiță was often referred to as the “Savage Samurai”. He was widely considered one of the greatest kickboxers.

He was ranked No. 1 heavyweight in the world in 2014. Between 2012 and 2015, he was at least a Top 2 heavyweight in the world. In January 2016, he was dropped from the rankings due to his unofficial retirement. Ghiță returned to the ring in October 2018 at Colosseum Tournament 9, when he defeated Dževad Poturak by technical knockout.

Biography
Ghiţă was born on 22 April 1981. Aside from kickboxing, from 2001 to 2008, Ghiță worked as a (SPP) agent assigned to protect the Romanian President.

Kickboxing career

Early career
"The Savage Samurai" made his debut in the World Muay Thai Championships in 1999 in Bangkok, Thailand. Daniel won all his matches by knockout before the semifinal, where he lost against Alexey Ignashov by one round (the only match the Belarusian won by decision and not KO).

Ghiță's career continued with success: he won the European Muay Thai champion in Germany in 2000, bronze medal at the World Muay Thai Championships in Thailand in 2001 and European Muay Thai runner-up in Portugal in 2002. In 2003, he recorded the fastest KO at the World Muay Thai Championships in Thailand, 30 seconds against an Australian fighter.

K-1 debut
In 2004, Ghiță entered the Local Kombat fighting circuit in Romania. His good record there gave him the opportunity to fight also in the K-1 fighting circuit. His K-1 debut was in 2007 at K-1 Fighting Network Romania 2007 against Nobu Hayashi.

On 11 August 2009 Ghiță broke Peter Aerts' record of fastest K-1 tournament win by defeating all three of his opponents in a total of 5 minutes and 15 seconds. Peter Aerts' record at that time was 6:43 and stood for 10 years before Ghiță's milestone, however, Aerts' record was set at a K-1 Grand Prix Final Round, whereas Ghiță's record was set in a qualifying GP.

In October 2010, Daniel Ghiță became the first Romanian fighter to qualify for the K-1 World Grand Prix Final in Tokyo, defeating Errol Zimmerman by KO in the last qualifying tournament in Seoul. At the tournament he fought Gokhan Saki in the quarterfinals. He lost the fight by decision after an extra round.

First world title shot
On 6 March 2011 Daniel Ghiță faced the Chakuriki fighter Hesdy Gerges and the current It's Showtime Heavyweight champion in Amsterdam. Ghiță was a slight underdog as Gerges almost beat Semmy Schilt the previous year and gave Badr Hari trouble in their fight. Though from the first round Ghiță scored effective shots, until the second round where a knee that skimmed his groin was ruled wrongly an 8 count. He lost the fight by unanimous decision a fight that many people thought Ghiță won.

Ghiță was scheduled to face Polish-Australian fighter Paul Slowinski at the It's Showtime 2011 Lyon, but his opponent pulled out and was replaced by Fikri Ameziane. Expectedly, Ghiță beat his opponent in the first round.

It's Showtime World title win
On 28 January 2012 at It's Showtime in Leeuwarden, Ghiță rematched Hesdy Gerges for the It's Showtime Heavyweight World title. After backing up Gerges to the neutral corner in the first round he knocked Hesdy out with a left hook and won his biggest world title to date in the process.

On 10 March 2012, it was Sergei Lascenko's turn to be defeated by the Savage Samurai via third-round TKO (head kick) at Mirko Filipović's Final Fight in Zagreb, Croatia.

On 12 May the Romanian beat Brian Douwes at It's Showtime 56 in the second round (2:16) by KO with a single counter left hook. His punch sent the Dutchman to the canvas thus adding another KO win to his record.

At the It's Showtime 2012 Brussels, he scored his 7th straight win by KO with a 2nd round liver kick of his Bosnian opponent Dževad Poturak. In his previous fight at the K-1 World Grand Prix in Madrid, Ghiță fought Wendell Roche until his corner threw in the towel in round two.

Although he was expected to fight in the 2012 K-1 World Grand Prix, Daniel was left out of the tournament.

Glory World Series
Ghiță then signed with rival kickboxing promotion, Glory.

He was set to face Fabiano Cyclone in the first round of the 2012 Glory Heavyweight Grand Slam at Glory 4: Tokyo - 2012 Heavyweight Grand Slam in Saitama, Japan on 31 December 2012. However, Cyclone pulled out of the bout and was replaced by his fellow countryman Jhonata Diniz. He defeated Diniz by unanimous decision after two, two-minute rounds due to the tournament's "best of three" format and advanced to the quarter-finals to face Mourad Bouzidi. After a close opening round, Ghiță stopped Bouzidi in the second round with a kick which injured his arm. In the semifinals, he came up against Jamal Ben Saddik, and dispatched of him within seconds, with a single kick to the body. An anticipated rematch with Semmy Schilt awaited him in the final, and, after a slow start to the three-minute first round, the Dutchman sent Ghiță to the canvas with a left high kick. Despite seemingly recovering from the blow, referee Joop Ubeda called a halt to the contest, giving Schilt the TKO win. He received a $100,000 check as the runner up on the tournament.

Ghiță rematched Gökhan Saki at Glory 6: Istanbul in Istanbul, Turkey on 6 April 2013 in a #1 contender's bout for the Glory Heavyweight Championship held by Semmy Schilt. The fight started out a little rough, as Saki caught a kick from the Romanian. He then backed Ghiță up and threw him to the mat with an illegal sweep according to the Glory rules. Ghiță landed hard, looking to have suffered an arm injury. Referee Joop Ubeda wrongly counted it as a down as Ghiță took a while to get to his feet. Even though injured, round two saw again a more consistent Ghiță but midway through the round, the Turk began landing heavy punches on him, dropping the Romanian thrice to take a win via TKO after the referee stepped in, calling the fight.

He halted his two-fight losing streak with a first-round knockout of Brice Guidon at Glory 9: New York - 2013 95kg Slam in New York City, New York, USA on 22 June 2013. He hurt Guidon with kicks and punches to the body, forcing him into the corner. As the Frenchman covered up, Ghiță ended the fight with a left hook when Guidon tried to punch his way out.

In the semi-finals of Glory 11: Chicago - Heavyweight World Championship Tournament in Hoffman Estates, Illinois, United States in October 2013, Ghiță stopped Anderson "Braddock" Silva with a first round body kick. Meeting Rico Verhoeven in the final, he suffered a unanimous decision defeat.

He rematched Errol Zimmerman at Glory 13: Tokyo - Welterweight World Championship Tournament in Tokyo, Japan on 21 December 2013 and knocked Zimmerman out for the second time, hurting him just seconds into the match and keeping up the pressure before putting him away with his left hook at the 0:35 mark of round one.

He rematched Rico Verhoeven in a bout for the vacant Glory Heavyweight (+95 kg/209 lb) Championship at Glory 17: Los Angeles in Inglewood, California, US on 21 June 2014, losing a unanimous decision.

Return
Ghiță returned to the ring at 2017 World Wushu Championships winning the bronze medal after semifinal's defeat on points to the 5-time world champion Hamid Reza Gholipour of Iran.

On 29 October 2018, he made his kickboxing return at Colosseum Tournament IX at the BT Arena in Cluj-Napoca, Romania. Ghiță defeated Dževad Poturak in the first round, after Poturak's corner threw in the towel in the first round. Poturak later revealed that his quadriceps muscle was torn during the fight.

He was scheduled to fight Petr Vondráček during Colosseum Tournament 11. Ghiță won the fight in the first round by a left hook KO.

Politics

In November 2015, Ghiță joined the United Romania Party (PRU), that being the kickboxing world champion's first involvement with Romanian politics. He left the party in June 2016, after a disagreement with the party president Bogdan Diaconu, who he claimed didn't follow the principles he promoted.

In October 2020, Ghiță joined the Social Democratic Party (PSD), to run for the Chamber of Deputies of Romania in the next legislative elections. He won a seat in the Chamber on PSD's party list as aftermath of the elections.

Acting
Ghiță appeared in the music video for the song "Cât poți tu de tare" by B.U.G. Mafia, which was released in December 2010.

Personal life
He supports UNICEF charities.

Titles
Professional:
 2013 Glory Heavyweight World Championship Tournament runner-up
 2012 Glory Heavyweight Grand Slam Tournament runner-up
 2012 It's Showtime World Heavyweight Champion
 2009 K-1 World Grand Prix 2009 in Tokyo Final 16 Qualifying GP Winner
 2005 World Kickboxing Network (W.K.N.) European Thai Boxing champion -96,600 kg
Amateur:
 2017 World Wushu Championships +90 kg/+198 lb Sanshou Bronze Medalist                                       
 2002 International Amateur Muay Thai Federation (IAMTF) European Championships in Caldas da Rainha, Portugal 
 2001 International Amateur Muay Thai Federation (IAMTF) World Championships in Bangkok, Thailand  -91 kg
 2000 European Muay Thai Championships in Germany  -91 kg
 1999 International Amateur Muay Thai Federation (IAMTF) World Championships in Bangkok, Thailand  -91 kg
Honors:
 2006 Fight.ro Fighter of the Year
 2005 Fight.ro Most Technical Fighter
 2019 Combatpress.com Comeback Fighter of the Year nomination

Kickboxing record

|-
|-  bgcolor="CCFFCC"
| 2019-03-29 || Win || align=left| Petr Vondráček || Colosseum Tournament 11 || Bucharest, Romania || KO (left hook) || 1 || 2:22
|-
|-  bgcolor="CCFFCC"
| 2018-10-29 || Win || align=left| Dževad Poturak || Colosseum Tournament 9 || Cluj-Napoca, Romania || TKO (towel thrown) || 1 || 1:38 
|-
|-  bgcolor="#FFBBBB" 
| 2014-06-21 || Loss ||align=left| Rico Verhoeven || Glory 17: Los Angeles || Inglewood, California, USA || Decision (unanimous) || 5 || 3:00
|-
! style=background:white colspan=9 |
|-
|-  bgcolor="CCFFCC"
| 2013-12-21 || Win ||align=left| Errol Zimmerman || Glory 13: Tokyo || Tokyo, Japan || KO (left hook) || 1 || 0:38
|-
|-  bgcolor="#FFBBBB"
| 2013-10-12 || Loss ||align=left| Rico Verhoeven || Glory 11: Chicago - Heavyweight World Championship Tournament, Final || Hoffman Estates, Illinois, USA || Decision (unanimous) || 3 || 3:00
|-
! style=background:white colspan=9 |
|-
|-  bgcolor="CCFFCC"
| 2013-10-12 || Win ||align=left| Anderson Silva || Glory 11: Chicago - Heavyweight World Championship Tournament, Semi Finals || Hoffman Estates, Illinois, USA || TKO (left body kick) || 1 || 1:56
|-  bgcolor="CCFFCC"
| 2013-06-22 || Win ||align=left| Brice Guidon || Glory 9: New York || New York City, New York, USA || KO (left hook) || 1 || 0:49
|-  bgcolor="#FFBBBB"
| 2013-04-06 || Loss ||align=left| Gökhan Saki || Glory 6: Istanbul || Istanbul, Turkey || TKO (punches) || 2 || 0:18
|-
! style=background:white colspan=9 |
|-
|-  bgcolor="#FFBBBB"
| 2012-12-31 || Loss ||align=left| Semmy Schilt || Glory 4: Tokyo - Heavyweight Grand Slam Tournament, Final || Saitama, Japan || TKO (left high kick) || 1 ||  2:52
|-
! style=background:white colspan=9 |
|-
|-  bgcolor="CCFFCC"
| 2012-12-31 || Win ||align=left| Jamal Ben Saddik || Glory 4: Tokyo - Heavyweight Grand Slam Tournament, Semi Finals || Saitama, Japan || KO (left body kick) || 1 || 0:25  
|-  bgcolor="CCFFCC"
| 2012-12-31 || Win ||align=left| Mourad Bouzidi || Glory 4: Tokyo - Heavyweight Grand Slam Tournament, Quarter Finals || Saitama, Japan || TKO (arm injury) || 2 || 0:40 
|-  bgcolor="CCFFCC"
| 2012-12-31 || Win ||align=left| Jhonata Diniz || Glory 4: Tokyo - Heavyweight Grand Slam Tournament, First Round || Saitama, Japan || Decision (unanimous) || 2 || 2:00 
|-  bgcolor="CCFFCC"
| 2012-06-30 || Win ||align=left| Dževad Poturak || It's Showtime 58 || Brussels, Belgium || KO (liver kick) || 2 || 0:45
|-  bgcolor="CCFFCC"
| 2012-05-27 || Win ||align=left| Wendell Roche || K-1 World MAX 2012 Championship Tournament Final 16, Super Fight || Madrid, Spain || TKO (towel thrown) || 2 || 1:15
|-  bgcolor="CCFFCC"
| 2012-05-12 || Win ||align=left| Brian Douwes || It's Showtime 56 || Kortrijk, Belgium || KO (left hook)|| 2 || 0:45
|-  bgcolor="CCFFCC"
| 2012-03-10 || Win ||align=left| Sergei Lascenko || Cro Cop Final Fight || Zagreb, Croatia || KO (right high kick) || 3 || 0:49
|-  bgcolor="CCFFCC"
| 2012-01-28 || Win ||align=left| Hesdy Gerges || It's Showtime 55 || Leeuwarden, Netherlands || KO (left hook) || 1 || 2:47
|-
! style=background:white colspan=9 |
|-
|-  bgcolor="#CCFFCC"
| 2011-06-11 || Win ||align=left| Erhan Deniz || It's Showtime 50 || Warsaw, Poland || KO (left hook to the body) || 2 || 2:50
|-
|-  bgcolor="#CCFFCC"
| 2011-05-14 || Win ||align=left| Fikri Ameziane || It's Showtime 48 || Lyon, France || KO (right low kick) || 1 || 3:00
|-
|-  bgcolor="#FFBBBB"
| 2011-03-06 || Loss ||align=left| Hesdy Gerges || It's Showtime 46 || Amsterdam, Netherlands || Decision (unanimous) || 3 || 3:00
|-  bgcolor="#FFBBBB"
| 2010-12-11 || Loss ||align=left| Gökhan Saki || K-1 World Grand Prix 2010 Final, Quarter Finals || Tokyo, Japan || Extra Round Decision (unanimous) || 4 || 3:00
|-
|-  bgcolor="#CCFFCC"
| 2010-10-02 || Win ||align=left| Errol Zimmerman || K-1 World Grand Prix 2010 in Seoul Final 16 || Seoul, Republic of Korea || KO (straight right) || 2 || 0:18
|-
! style=background:white colspan=9 |
|-
|-  bgcolor="#FFBBBB"
| 2010-05-29 || Loss ||align=left| Ashwin Balrak || It's Showtime 41 || Amsterdam, Netherlands || Decision (unanimous) || 3 || 3:00
|-  bgcolor="#CCFFCC"
| 2010-02-13 || Win ||align=left| Dževad Poturak || It's Showtime 38 || Prague, Czech Republic || Decision (unanimous) || 3 || 3:00
|-  bgcolor="#CCFFCC"
| 2009-12-05 || Win ||align=left| Sergei Kharitonov || K-1 World Grand Prix 2009 Final, Reserve Fight || Yokohama, Japan || KO (Right low kick) || 3 || 0:36
|-  bgcolor="#FFBBBB"
| 2009-09-26 || Loss ||align=left| Semmy Schilt || K-1 World Grand Prix 2009 Final 16 || Seoul, Republic of Korea || Decision (unanimous) || 3 || 3:00
|-
! style=background:white colspan=9 |
|-
|-  bgcolor="#CCFFCC"
| 2009-08-11 || Win ||align=left| Sergei Lascenko || K-1 World Grand Prix 2009 in Tokyo Final 16 Qualifying GP, Final || Tokyo, Japan || TKO (three knockdown rule) || 1 || 2:19
|-
! style=background:white colspan=9 |
|-
|-  bgcolor="#CCFFCC"
| 2009-08-11 || Win ||align=left| Yuki Niimura || K-1 World Grand Prix 2009 in Tokyo Final 16 Qualifying GP || Tokyo, Japan, Semi Finals || TKO (two knockdown rule) || 1 || 1:28
|-  bgcolor="#CCFFCC"
| 2009-08-11 || Win ||align=left| John Love || K-1 World Grand Prix 2009 in Tokyo Final 16 Qualifying GP, Quarter Finals|| Tokyo, Japan || TKO (two knockdown rule) || 1 || 1:28
|-  bgcolor="#CCFFCC"
| 2009-05-16 || Win ||align=left| Tomáš Hron || It's Showtime 33 || Amsterdam, Netherlands || KO (left low kick) || 2 || 2:21
|-  bgcolor="#CCFFCC"
| 2009-02-28 || Win ||align=left| Igor Mihaljević || K-1 Rules Tournament 2009 in Budapest || Budapest, Hungary || KO (right low kick) || 1 || 1:20
|-  bgcolor="#FFBBBB"
| 2008-12-20 || Loss ||align=left| Roman Kleibl || K-1 Fighting Network Prague 2008 || Prague, Czech Republic || Extra Round Decision || 4 || 3:00
|-  bgcolor="#FFBBBB"
| 2008-11-06 || Loss ||align=left| Dževad Poturak || Local Kombat 31 || Buzău, Romania || Decision (unanimous) || 3 || 3:00
|-  bgcolor="#CCFFCC"
| 2008-06-06 || Win ||align=left| Björn Bregy || Local Kombat 30 || Timișoara, Romania || Decision (unanimous) || 3 || 3:00
|-  bgcolor="#CCFFCC"
| 2008-03-15 || Win ||align=left| Freddy Kemayo || Local Kombat 29 || Arad, Romania || KO (left hook) || 2 || 2:30
|-  bgcolor="#CCFFCC"
| 2007-12-14 || Win ||align=left| Tadas Rimkevicius || Local Kombat 28 || Brașov, Romania || KO (low kick) || 2 || N/A 
|-  bgcolor="#CCFFCC"
| 2007-11-03 || Win ||align=left| James Phillips || Local Kombat 27 || Drobeta-Turnu Severin, Romania || KO (low kicks) || 2 || 1:58
|-  bgcolor="#CCFFCC"
| 2007-05-04 || Win ||align=left| Nobu Hayashi || K-1 Fighting Network Romania 2007 || Bucharest, Romania || Decision (unanimous) || 3 || 3:00
|-  bgcolor="#CCFFCC"
| 2006-12-16 || Win ||align=left| Gregory Tony || Local Kombat 24 || Bucharest, Romania || KO (right hook) || 2 || 2:09
|-  bgcolor="#CCFFCC"
| 2006-09-29 || Win ||align=left| Humberto Evora || Local Kombat 22 || Iași, Romania || KO (right high kick)|| 1 || 2:19
|-  bgcolor="#CCFFCC"
| 2006-06-02 || Win ||align=left| Muhammed Ali Durmaz || Local Kombat 21 || Bacău, Romania || TKO (towel thrown) || 1 || 2:10  
|-  bgcolor="#FFBBBB"
| 2006-03-10 || Loss ||align=left| Gregory Tony || Local Kombat 19 || Iași, Romania || KO (right high kick) || 1 || 2:19
|-  bgcolor="#CCFFCC"
| 2005-09-16 || Win ||align=left| Brecht Wallis || Local Kombat 16 || Cluj-Napoca, Romania || Decision (unanimous) || 3 || 3:00
|-  bgcolor="#CCFFCC"
| 2005-05-14 || Win ||align=left| Mourad Bouzidi || Local Kombat 14 || Bucharest, Romania || Decision (unanimous) || 3 || 3:00
|-
! style=background:white colspan=9 |
|-
|-  bgcolor="#CCFFCC"
| 2005-02-11 || Win ||align=left| Abel Jesus || Local Kombat 12 || Cluj-Napoca, Romania || TKO (corner stoppage) || 2 || N/A
|-  bgcolor="#CCFFCC"
| 2004-10-22 || Win ||align=left| Ivica Perković || Local Kombat 10 || Brăila, Romania || KO || 3 || N/A 
|-  bgcolor="#CCFFCC"
| 2004-07-23 || Win ||align=left| Florin Golopența || Local Kombat 8  || Galați, Romania || TKO || 3 || N/A 
|-  bgcolor="#CCFFCC"
| 2004-05-14 || Win ||align=left| Anatoly Danilov || Local Kombat 6 || Galați, Romania || TKO || 3 || N/A
|-  bgcolor="#CCFFCC"
| 2004-03-26 || Win ||align=left| Tihamér Brunner || Local Kombat 5 || Brașov, Romania || Decision (unanimous) || 3 || 3:00
|-  bgcolor="#CCFFCC"
| 2004-02-26 || Win ||align=left| Nikola Jovanović || Local Kombat 4 || Brașov, Romania || TKO || 2 || N/A
|-
| colspan=9 | Legend:

See also 
List of male kickboxers

References

External links
Profile at GLORY

1981 births
Living people
Romanian male kickboxers
Heavyweight kickboxers
Romanian Muay Thai practitioners
Romanian sanshou practitioners
Sportspeople from Bucharest
Romanian expatriate sportspeople in the Netherlands
Glory kickboxers
SUPERKOMBAT kickboxers
Eastern Orthodox Christians from Romania
Social Democratic Party (Romania) politicians
Members of the Chamber of Deputies (Romania)